Griffing Sandusky Airport  was a public airport in Erie County, Ohio, next to Sandusky Bay three miles southeast of Sandusky. The airport permanently closed on December 31, 2013 and the FAA A/FD and VFR sectional charts no longer show the airport as open or operational. Instrument approach procedures are no longer available from the FAA's website. All hangars and the entrance were demolished in April, 2016. The Sandusky Register confirmed that the city announced that a sports park will replace the airport and now has opened in spring 2017 called the Cedar Point Sports Center.

Facilities and aircraft 
The airport covered  at an elevation of 580 feet (177 m) above mean sea level. It had two asphalt runways: 18/36, 2,593 by 40 feet (790 x 12 m) and 9/27, 3,559 by 60 feet (1,085 x 18 m).

In the year ending May 6, 2008 the airport had 112,100 operations, average 307 per day: 58% general aviation, 40% air taxi and 1% military.
44 aircraft were then based at this airport: 79.5% single-engine and 20.5% multi-engine.

Airlines and destinations
Griffing Flying Service offered scheduled passenger service to Sandusky until December 2013. The nearest airport with scheduled passenger service is Erie-Ottawa International Airport in Port Clinton.

References

External links 
 Aerial photo as of 10 October 2000 from USGS The National Map
 

Defunct airports in Ohio
Buildings and structures in Sandusky, Ohio
Transportation in Erie County, Ohio
2013 disestablishments in Ohio